James R. "Bo" Mitchell (born September 5, 1970) is the state representative for District 50 in the Tennessee House of Representatives and a two-term councilman for District 35 in the Nashville Metro Council.

Education
A middle Tennessee native, Mitchell graduated from Dickson County High School in 1988 and obtained a Bachelor of Arts degree in Political Science from David Lipscomb University in 1992.  In 2003 he earned a Juris Doctor from the Nashville School of Law.

Career
Mitchell started his career in politics starting in 1992 volunteering for the Clinton/Gore campaign. He is a well known Democratic operative in the state of Tennessee. Mitchell has managed campaigns for former Tennessee State Representative Gary Moore and the late Tennessee State Senator Pete Springer along with General Sessions Judge Leon Rubin.

In 2007 Mitchell accepted a position as Director of Community Affairs for former Governor Phil Bredesen.

Currently Mitchell is a Regional Director for Health Cost Solutions.

Metro Council
In 2007, Mitchell ran for Metro Council in District 35, which includes part of Bellevue, winning 56–44.  In 2011, he successfully ran for re-election, winning 65-35.  Due to term limits in the Metropolitan Charter, Mitchell's current term in this office will be his final one, at least consecutively.

During the 2010 Nashville flood, Mitchell located boats for water rescues before participating in some of those rescues and worked to assist neighbors after the flood, including simplifying the permitting process that allowed residents to rebuild. He also worked to bring a new library to Bellevue, which is scheduled to open in 2014. He led the expansion of the Harpeth River Greenway, added over 440 acres of protected land to Warner Parks, brought private sector curbside recycling to Bellevue, and secured resources for the FiftyForward J. L. Turner Center Transportation Program. In 2012, Mitchell voted against a property tax increase each time it was brought to a vote.

House of Representatives District 69 campaign
In 2000, Mitchell ran in the Democratic Primary for Tennessee House of Representatives District 69. HD 69 was made up of Dickson and Hickman counties.

The race was made up of four candidates: Bo Mitchell, David Shepard, James Edward, and Tom Waychoff.

The primary was held on August 3, 2000, Mitchell came in second with 2,586 to David Shepard who won with 3,329. Shepard won the subsequent general election in November and still represents most of that area in the Tennessee General Assembly, although district boundaries have changed considerably due to subsequent redistricting.

House of Representatives District 50
In 2012, Mitchell ran for the General Assembly again as a Democrat, this time in the district to which he had moved following his earlier defeat. His campaign focused primarily on job creation and education. He won election and was sworn into office on January 8, 2013.

Personal
Mitchell lives in Bellevue with his wife, Chastity, and his two children, Parker and Brady. The Mitchells are members of Crosspoint Church in Bellevue.

References

External links
Bo Mitchell Campaign Web Site
Bo Mitchell's profile at the Tennessee General Assembly
Bo Mitchell's profile at the Nashville Metro Council

Democratic Party members of the Tennessee House of Representatives
1964 births
Living people
21st-century American politicians
Metropolitan Council members (Nashville, Tennessee)
People from Davidson County, Tennessee
Lipscomb University alumni
Nashville School of Law alumni